Laurence Henry Lau (born May 10, 1954) is an American television and stage actor, best known for his roles in several soap operas.

Lau was born in Long Beach, California and raised in Lake Oswego, Oregon. He attended Columbia University and Brigham Young University.

One of his first roles was on the TV comedy/drama Eight Is Enough in 1980.

He first became popular by playing the role of rich kid Greg Nelson on All My Children (1981–1986), in which his character got involved with a girl from the other side of the tracks, Jenny Gardner (Kim Delaney). The pair was considered to be a supercouple and the status booted Lau to stardom.  Other notable soap roles include NBC's Another World as Jamie Frame (1986–1990), and ABC's One Life to Live as attorney Sam Rappaport (2001—2003), taking over from actor Kale Browne.

In 2007, Lau played Greeber in  Scituate, a play written by Martin Casella and directed by David Hilder, at TBG Arts Mainstage in New York City. Soap opera critic for Atlantic Canada's Breakfest Television Matthew Borden claimed that this role would solidify Laurence as a big time soap opera actor.
On May 20, 2008, Lau returned to All My Children as Greg Nelson to catch up with old pals Jesse and Angie Hubbard and brother-in-law Tad Martin.

On August 17, 2008, Lau joined the cast of As the World Turns in the recurring role of Brian Wheatley. Following the end of his stint on ATWT, Lau booked the pilot Upstate, which filmed on location in Syracuse, New York. However, the pilot was not picked up by a network in time for the next television season.

Lau also made appearances on primetime television shows including ABC's The Love Boat, CBS' The Waltons, NBC's Frasier, and CBS' JAG and Diagnosis: Murder.

Lau has also appeared on stage productions such as Arrivals, Spine, The Exonerated, The Goat, Becky's New Car, Scituate, God of Carnage, and Psycho Therapy. On stage he has played Steve Heidebrecht in the Broadway National Tour of August: Osage County starring Estelle Parsons, as well as numerous roles Off Broadway and at regional theaters throughout the US.

References

External links

Sam Rappaport profile from OLTL Online
Greg Nelson profile from The AMC Pages

American male soap opera actors
American people of German descent
American male television actors
American male stage actors
Male actors from Long Beach, California
1954 births
Living people